Enoch Penney-Laryea (born May 7, 1997) is a professional Canadian football linebacker for the Toronto Argonauts of the Canadian Football League (CFL).

Early life
Penney-Laryea was born in Ghana and moved with his family to Tuckahoe, New York, when his father transferred to the United Nations Department for Safety and Security in New York. Penney-Laryea continued to live in Tuckahoe when his father was transferred to South Sudan.

College and university career

Union Dutchmen
Penney-Laryea first played college football as a running back for the Union Dutchmen from 2016 to 2017. He played in eight games where he had 17 carries for 90 yards. In 2017, he suffered a foot injury, which limited his final season at Union.

McMaster Marauders
After seeking other schools for transfer and discussing with a friend from Canada, Penney-Laryea decided to enroll at McMaster University for the Marauders football program and the school's academics. Due to the injury to his foot, he switched positions to linebacker and then to defensive lineman for the 2018 season and continued there for his three seasons with the Marauders. He did not play in 2020 due to the cancellation of the 2020 U Sports football season, but played in 12 games from 2018 to 2021 where he had 55 tackles, 15.5 tackles for a loss, 10.5 sacks, one interception, and two forced fumbles.

Professional career
Following a conversation with McMaster's offensive coordinator, Corey Grant, Penney-Laryea was informed that he qualified as a National player in the Canadian Football League, despite being born in Ghana and growing up in the United States, due to eligibility changes implemented in 2021. He was then drafted in the third round, 26th overall, in the 2022 CFL Draft by the Toronto Argonauts and signed with the team on May 10, 2022. Following training camp, he made the team's active roster and played in his first professional game on June 16, 2022, against the Montreal Alouettes. On July 24, 2022, his teammate, Robbie Smith, forced a fumble on a kickoff return, of which Penney-Laryea recovered and returned ten yards for his first career touchdown.

References

External links
Toronto Argonauts bio 

1997 births
Living people
American football linebackers
Canadian football linebackers
Ghanaian players of American football
Ghanaian players of Canadian football
McMaster Marauders football players
Players of American football from New York (state)
People from Tuckahoe, Westchester County, New York
Toronto Argonauts players
Union Dutchmen football players